Kulu or KULU may refer to:

Places 
 Kullu, also spelled Kulu, a town in the state of Himachal Pradesh, India
 Kulu, Iran, a village in Lorestan Province
 Kulu, Nigeria, a village - see List of villages in Ogun State
 Kulu, Konya, a town in Konya Province, Turkey
 Kulu, Nallıhan, a village in Ankara Province, Turkey
 Kulu, Suluova, a village in Amasya Province, Turkey
 Kulu (river), Russia

People 
 Kulū Isfandiyār (died 1361), king of the Sarbadars from 1346 to 1347
 Kulu Ferreira (born 1959), South African former rugby union player
 Kulu Yahaya (born 1976), Ghanaian footballer

Other uses 
 Kulu language, a Benue-Congo language of Nigeria
 Kulu makası (Kulu junction), where State road D.715 (Turkey) merges with State road D.750
 KULU, former callsign of KCRX-FM, a radio station licensed to Seaside, Oregon, United States

See also 
 Kulu Vase, a Buddhist goblet in the British Museum
 Pericopsis laxiflora, a deciduous shrub or tree known as Kulu Kulu in some regions
 Kullu (disambiguation)
 Kulus (disambiguation)